Chaédria LaBouvier is an American curator and writer. In 2019, LaBouvier became the first black woman and the first person of Cuban descent to curate an exhibition in the Guggenheim's 80-year history, as well as the first black author of a Guggenheim catalogue, for the exhibition, "Basquiat's Defacement: The Untold Story". Her public allegations of racist treatment by the Guggenheim were  not substantiated by an outside investigation, but were followed by the resignation of its chief curator and artistic director, as well as the hiring of its first full-time black curator.

Education

In 2007, LaBouvier received a B.A. in history from Williams College. In 2014, she earned a masters of fine arts degree in screenwriting from the University of California, Los Angeles (UCLA).

Career
In 2019, LaBouvier was hired by the Solomon R. Guggenheim Museum as the first black guest curator and the second black curator in the history of the Guggenheim (following Nigerian curator Okwui Enwezor, 1996) to organize an exhibition. She was the first black author to write a Guggenheim catalogue.

The exhibition, "Basquiat's Defacement: The Untold Story," opened in June 2019 and covered not only Basquiat's work, but also the history of Michael Stewart, whose death from police brutality inspired the painting, The Death of Michael Stewart. Other paintings by Basquiat on the theme of police brutality and art featuring Stewart by Keith Haring, George Condo and Lyle Ashton Harris were also included in the exhibition. The focus of the show on Stewart and the struggle of black men living in the United States set the show apart from other exhibitions on Basquiat, according to WNYC. The show ran for five months with hundreds of thousands of visitors.

On February 25, 2021, LaBouvier received a Bicentennial Medal from Williams College, becoming the youngest medalist in the award's history.

Cultural influence 
LaBouvier called her experience with the Guggenheim as shaped by artistic director Nancy Spector and other leadership as "the most racist professional experience of my life." LaBouvier described additional specific instances of her treatment on her personal Twitter account and in news articles.

After criticism from LaBouvier, the Guggenheim hired an external firm to investigate her claims. It ultimately found "no evidence that Ms. LaBouvier was subject to adverse treatment on the basis of her race."  However, while the investigation was under way, museum employees submitted a public letter to the board, calling for them to "replace those members of the executive cabinet who have repeatedly proven that they are not committed to decisive, anti-racist action and do not act in good faith with BIPOC leaders." After the investigation's conclusion, Spector voluntarily parted ways with the museum.

Because of her public statements and actions, LaBouvier has been recognized as a catalyst for the "Change the Museum" movement.

References 

Williams College alumni
University of California, Los Angeles alumni
African-American women writers
African-American curators
African-American women journalists
African-American journalists
American art curators
American women curators
Living people
Year of birth missing (living people)
21st-century African-American people
21st-century African-American women